Qaradağlı (also, Gharadaghli, Garadaghly, and Karadagly) is a village and municipality in the Tartar Rayon of Azerbaijan.  It has a population of 2,092.

References 

Populated places in Tartar District